Oracle Identity Management, a software suite marketed by Oracle Corporation, provides identity and access management (IAM) technologies.

The name of the software suite closely resembles the name of one of its components, Oracle Identity Manager.

Components

Sun rebranding 
After Oracle acquired Sun Microsystems, they re-branded a number of products that overlapped in function. (See table below.)  The re-branding, and Oracle's commitment to ongoing support and maintenance of these products were revealed by Hasan Rizvi, Senior Vice President of Oracle Fusion Middleware in an Oracle and Sun Identity Management Strategy webcast in 2010.

Other information 
Originally, in the 10g and earlier versions, the Java-based portions of the suite ran mainly on OC4J, although some components (e.g. OIM) supported other J2EE appservers. For the 11g version, Oracle Corporation ported the OC4J-based components to WebLogic.

 the software was undergoing Common Criteria evaluation process.

In March 2005 Oracle acquired Oblix and incorporated their web access control software into Oracle Identity Management.

See also
 Oracle Directory Server Enterprise Edition
 Oracle Internet Directory
 Oracle Technology Network
 Oracle Fusion Middleware

References

External links
 Oracle Identity Management
 Identity Theft Protection

Identity management